Kumberg is a municipality in the district of Graz-Umgebung in the Austrian state of Styria. It has 3909 inhabitants (as of January 1, 2021).

Population

References

Graz Highlands
Cities and towns in Graz-Umgebung District